Amina Khoulani is a Syrian survivor of Assad's prisons who gained exile in Manchester in the UK in 2014. Since then she has campaigned for other prisoners and helped to support their families. She was chosen as an International Woman of Courage in March 2020.

Life

In 2013 she was arrested after peaceful protests in Syria. She would serve six months but her husband would be imprisoned for two and a half years in the Sednaya prison. 140,000 Syrians went to jail without charge and her three brothers would die in jail.

In 2014 she left Syria. Khoulani devoted herself to campaigning for the release of other Syrian prisoners and in 2017 she was one of the founders of "Families for Freedom". The British-based charity helps the families of those detained or missing.

She was chosen as an International Woman of Courage on 4 March 2020 by the US Secretary of State. After the ceremony she was hosted in Birmingham, Alabama.

Private life
She is married. They have three children and they live in Heald in Manchester.

References

Living people
People from Manchester
Syrian activists
Year of birth missing (living people)
Recipients of the International Women of Courage Award